Island at War is a British television series that tells the story of the German occupation of the Channel Islands. It primarily focuses on three local families: the upper class Dorrs, the middle class Mahys, and the working class Jonases, and four German officers. The fictional island of St. Gregory serves as a stand-in for the real-life islands Guernsey and Jersey, and the story is compiled from the events on both islands.

Produced by Granada Television in Manchester, Island at War had an estimated budget of £9,000,000 and was filmed on location in the Isle of Man from August 2003 to October 2003. When the series was shown in the UK, it appeared in six 70-minute episodes.

Cast
James Wilby as James Dorr
Clare Holman as Felicity Dorr
Sam Heughan as Phillip Dorr (aka Mr. Brotherson)
Owen Teale as Wilf Jonas
Julia Ford as Kathleen Jonas
Sean Gallagher as Sheldon Leveque
Saskia Reeves as Cassie Mahy
Julian Wadham as Urban Mahy
Joanne Froggatt as Angelique Mahy
Samantha Robinson as June Mahy
Louisa Clein as Zelda Kay
Philip Glenister as Baron Von Rheingarten
Daniel Flynn as Captain Muller
Colin Tierney as Oberwachtmeister Wimmel
Conor Mullen as Oberleutnant Walker
Andrew Havill as Oberleutnant Flach
Laurence Fox as Bernhardt Tellemann
Richard Dempsey as Eugene La Salle
Ann Rye as Ada Jonas
Sean Ward as Colin Jonas

Episodes

Reception
Overall, the miniseries earned more favourable reviews in the United States than in the United Kingdom.  In a review by Anita Gates for The New York Times, Gates wrote, "You can call 'Island at War' a soap opera, as some British television critics have, but if that's true this soap opera is a gripping, poetic one—about moral courage in many guises. You might also call it a drama of manners." New York magazine called the series "reasonably absorbing but no great classic." In the Channel Islands themselves, the series faced widespread criticism in the local press due to inaccuracy, mispronunciation of names (for example, 'Mahy' was pronounced 'Mah-hee' rather than the correct 'Ma'yee'), and the fact that the series was filmed not on the islands themselves, but the Isle of Man. The Guernsey Press noted that "the programme caused outrage among many people who accused the producers of distorting Guernsey history."

DVD release 
The complete DVD collection was released in 2008, by Acorn Media UK. The DVD received a second release in 2017 by Network.

Cancelled second series 
Although highly successful during its initial transmission the series ended, rather abruptly. The writer Stephen Mallatratt died from cancer shortly after the series broadcast. This, coupled with the high production cost and controversy over historical accuracy, meant the series came to an end. Each episode cost around £1 million to produce.

References

External links

Island at War  at PBS

2000s British drama television series
2004 British television series debuts
2004 British television series endings
Channel Islands
Films shot in the Isle of Man
Films set in the Channel Islands
2000s British television miniseries
ITV television dramas
Television series by ITV Studios
Television shows produced by Granada Television
Military history of the Channel Islands during World War II
Works about the Channel Islands
World War II television drama series
English-language television shows